The 1983 Madrid Grand Prix Trofeo was a men's tennis tournament played on outdoor clay courts. It was the 12th edition of the tournament and was part of the Super Series of the 1983 Volvo Grand Prix tennis circuit. It was held at the Real Sociedad Hípico del Club de Campo in Madrid, Spain from 25 April until 1 May 1983. Second-seeded Yannick Noah won the singles title.

Finals

Singles
 Yannick Noah defeated  Henrik Sundström 3–6, 6–0, 6–2, 6–4
 It was Noah's 1st singles title of the year and the 12th of his career.

Doubles
 Pavel Složil /  Heinz Günthardt defeated  Markus Günthardt /  Zoltán Kuhárszky 6–3, 6–3

References

External links
 ITF tournament edition details

Madrid Tennis Grand Prix
Madrid
Madrid